Victor Barnett Lobo (1914 – death date unknown) was a Panamanian baseball right fielder in the Negro leagues. He played with the Newark Eagles in 1944.

References

External links
 and Seamheads 

Newark Eagles players
1914 births
Year of death unknown
Panamanian expatriate baseball players in the United States
Baseball outfielders